Joseph Jan van Crombrugghe (22 September 1770 – 10 March 1842) was a lawyer and a politician in the United Kingdom of the Netherlands and later in Belgium.

He was member of the provincial council (Dutch: Provinciale Staten) of East Flanders (1816–1817), member of the House of Commons of the Staten-Generaal (1817–1824), burgomaster of Sint-Martens-Leerne (1820–1825), burgomaster of Ghent (1825–1836, 1840–1842) and a member of the Provincial Council of East Flanders (1836–1842) for the liberal party.

Sources
 Joseph Van Crombrugghe (Liberal archive)
 Mr. J.J. van Crombrugghe at the Dutch parliament website

1770 births
1842 deaths
19th-century Belgian lawyers
Mayors of Ghent
Members of the House of Representatives (Netherlands)